Lord Cecil Reginald John Manners DL (4 February 1868 – 8 September 1945), was a British Conservative politician.

Early life
Manners was the second son of John Manners, 7th Duke of Rutland, by his second marriage to Janetta Hughan, daughter of Thomas Hughan. Henry Manners, 8th Duke of Rutland, was his half-brother and Lord Edward Manners his brother. His half-nephew was John Manners, 9th Duke of Rutland.

Career
In early 1900 he visited South Africa, travelling with troops taking part in the Second Boer War. While acting as a newspaper correspondent, he was among the prisoners captured by the Boers in the course of Lord Roberts' advance on 29 May 1900.

He succeeded his brother as Member of Parliament for Melton in 1900, a seat he held until 1906. On 10 June 1902, he was appointed a Deputy Lieutenant for Derbyshire.

Personal life
Manners died in September 1945, aged 77, killed by a train at Crowborough railway station. A fully-loaded six-chambered revolver was found on his body and was recorded as "Death by decapitation by throwing himself in front of a train while the balance of mind was disturbed."

References

External links

1868 births
1945 deaths
Conservative Party (UK) MPs for English constituencies
Deputy Lieutenants of Derbyshire
UK MPs 1900–1906
Younger sons of dukes
C
Railway accident deaths in England